In graph theory, a subcoloring is an assignment of colors to a graph's vertices such that each color class induces a vertex disjoint union of cliques. That is, each color class should form a cluster graph.

The subchromatic number χS(G) of a graph G is the fewest colors needed in any subcoloring of G.

Every proper coloring and cocoloring of a graph are also subcolorings, so the subchromatic number of any graph is at most equal to the cochromatic number, which is at most equal to the chromatic number.

Subcoloring is as difficult to solve exactly as coloring, in the sense that (like coloring) it is NP-complete. More specifically,
the problem of determining whether a planar graph has subchromatic number at most 2 is NP-complete, even if it is a
 triangle-free  graph with maximum degree 4  ,
 comparability graph with maximum degree 4 ,
 line graph of a bipartite graph with maximum degree 4 ,
 graph with girth 5 .

The subchromatic number of a cograph can be computed in polynomial time . For every fixed integer r, it is possible to decide in polynomial time whether the subchromatic number of interval  and permutation graphs is at most r  .

References
.
.
.
.
.
.
.

Graph coloring